The 2017–18 Utah State Aggies women's basketball team represents Utah State University in the 2017–18 NCAA Division I women's basketball season. The Aggies were led by sixth year head coach Jerry Finkbeiner. The Aggies played their home games at the Smith Spectrum and were members of the Mountain West Conference. They finished the season 7–23, 5–13 in Mountain West play to finish in a three way tie for eighth place. They lost in the first round of the Mountain West women's tournament to Air Force.

Previous season
They finished the season 17–15, 9–9 in Mountain West play to finish in sixth place. They advanced to the quarterfinals of the Mountain West women's tournament where they lost to UNLV. They were invited to the Women's Basketball Invitational where they lost to Idaho in the first round.

Roster

Schedule

|-
!colspan=9 style=| Exhibition

|-
!colspan=9 style=| Non-conference regular season

|-
!colspan=9 style=| Mountain West regular season

|-
!colspan=9 style=|Mountain West Women's Tournament

See also
2017–18 Utah State Aggies men's basketball team

References 

Utah State
Utah State Aggies women's basketball seasons
Aggies
Aggies